Adelaide of Hungary ( – 27 January 1062) was the only daughter of King Andrew I of Hungary of the Árpád dynasty and Anastasia of Kiev. She was the second wife of Vratislav II of Bohemia, whom she married in 1058. She was a good dynastic match for Vratislav, as he profited from the alliance with her father. They had four children, including Bretislaus II of Bohemia and Judith of Bohemia. Vratislav became duke in 1061 after the death of his brother; thus, Adelaide was duchess for only a short time before her death early in 1062.

Her husband remarried shortly after her death to Świętosława of Poland and was later crowned as the first King of Bohemia in 1085.

Notes

References

1040s births
1062 deaths
Daughters of kings
Year of birth uncertain
Duchesses of Bohemia
Adelaide Arpad
Hungarian princesses
Place of birth unknown
Place of death unknown
11th-century Hungarian women
11th-century Hungarian people
11th-century Bohemian women
11th-century Bohemian people